National Route 255 is a national highway of Japan connecting Hadano, Kanagawa and Odawara, Kanagawa in Japan, with a total length of 20.3 km (12.61 mi).

References

National highways in Japan
Roads in Kanagawa Prefecture